The Costume Designers Guild Award for Best Costume Design – Contemporary TV Series is one of the annual awards given by the Costume Designers Guild for costume design in American television.

Winners

1990s

2000s

2010s

2020s

Programs with multiple awards

4 wins
 Sex and the City

3 wins
 Glee
 Ugly Betty

2 wins
 American Horror Story 
 Schitt's Creek

Programs with multiple nominations

6 nominations
 Sex and the City
 The Sopranos

5 nominations
 Six Feet Under

4 nominations
 Big Love
 Dancing with the Stars
 House of Cards

3 nominations
 Alias
 American Horror Story
 Desperate Housewives
 Emily in Paris
 Entourage
 Euphoria
 Glee
 Grace and Frankie
 Saturday Night Live
 Will & Grace

2 nominations
 Ally McBeal
 Big Little Lies
 Empire
 Hacks
 Modern Family
 Nashville
 Nip/Tuck
 Ray Donovan
 Revenge
 Scandal
 Schitt's Creek
 Treme

References

Costume Designers Guild Awards